¿Con Quién Se Queda el Perro? (English: Who does the dog stay with?) is the third studio album by Mexican pop rock duo Jesse & Joy, released on December 6, 2011 through Warner Music Mexico.

The album and its songs won four Latin Grammy Awards at the Latin Grammy Awards of 2012, including Record of the Year and Song of the Year for "¡Corre!", and Best Contemporary Pop Vocal Album. The album was nominated for the Best Latin Pop Album category at the 55th Annual Grammy Awards. "Llorar" was nominated for the Latin Grammy Award for Song of the Year at the Latin Grammy Awards of 2013. The album was further nominated for Pop Album of the Year at the Premio Lo Nuestro 2013. "¡Corre!" was featured in the novela La que no podía amar. "Llorar" was also featured in the telenovela Corona de lágrimas.

Track listing
Following, the track list of ¿Con Quién Se Queda El Perro?. All songs were written by Jesse & Joy, with additional writing noted. All songs produced by Martin Terefe.

The deluxe edition was released December 4, 2012. It includes a DVD with five music videos and two documentary films. All songs written by Jesse & Joy, except for "Imagine"; additional writing is noted. All songs produced by Jesse Huerta, additional producing is noted.

Charts

Weekly charts

Year-end charts

Sales and certifications

Awards and nominations

References

2011 albums
Jesse & Joy albums
Spanish-language albums
Latin Grammy Award for Best Contemporary Pop Vocal Album
Warner Music Group albums